Don Emilio Macias Memorial National High School is a high school located in Baranggay San Francisco, Santa Catalina, Negros Oriental, in the Philippines It is 76 kilometers away from Dumaguete, the provincial capital. It is 25 kilometers away from Bayawan and the town of Siaton and 18 kilometers from the town proper of Sta. Catalina. It is considered as the oldest school of the town and was established in December 1982.

High schools in Negros Oriental
Educational institutions established in 1982
1982 establishments in the Philippines